Bartłomiej Burman (born 1 May 2001) is a Polish former professional footballer who played as a defender.

Career
On 15 January 2021, Burman signed a one-and-a-half-year contract, with an option for another two years, with Ekstraklasa side Warta Poznań.

On 7 January 2022, he was loaned to I liga side Skra Częstochowa until the end of the season.

His only appearance in the 2022–23 season came on 22 July 2022, when he entered the pitch in the 77th minute of a 2–0 home win against Chojniczanka Chojnice. Shortly after, Burman was diagnosed with a genetic heart problem. Following medical consultations, he was advised to stop competing on a professional level. He announced his retirement on 12 January 2023.

Career statistics

Club

References

External links

2001 births
Living people
Footballers from Poznań
Polish footballers
Association football defenders
Lech Poznań II players
Lech Poznań players
Nielba Wągrowiec players
Warta Poznań players
Skra Częstochowa players
Ekstraklasa players
I liga players
II liga players
III liga players